Mohd Shahril bin Saa'ri (born 7 March 1990) is a Malaysian footballer who plays  as a goalkeeper for Malaysia Super League club Kelantan.

Career statistics

Club

Notes

References

External links
 

1990 births
Living people
Malaysian footballers
People from Terengganu
Terengganu FC players
Sabah F.C. (Malaysia) players
Terengganu F.C. II players
Kedah Darul Aman F.C. players
Malaysia Super League players
Association football goalkeepers
Malaysian people of Malay descent